Kathleen Carlo-Kendall born in Tanana, Alaska, is a Koyukon Athabaskan professional carver from Alaska.

Background

Kathleen Carlo was born in Tanana, Alaska, the daughter of Poldine and William "Bill" Carlo. She moved to Fairbanks at the age of five where she lives today. She started making her artwork from the Native Arts Center in the University of Alaska, Fairbanks. Her teacher was Ronald Senungetuk. She has always loved artwork since her highschool years. Kathleen's artwork sometimes symbolizes an event or spirit, other times it is just what comes out of the shape of the wood. She received a Bachelor of Fine Arts in Metalsmithing, but she doesn't consider herself a metalsmith, but more of a woodworker.

Art career
Kathleen received her Bachelor of Fine Arts degree in 1984 from the University of Alaska Fairbanks.  She was one of only a few women to carve masks at that time. Besides mask making, Kathleen also enjoys working with panels of wood and metals, ice sculpting, and teaching.  Since 1990, she has worked as a Native Arts Carving Instructor for the University of Alaska Summer Fine Arts Camp.  She has won many awards for her work and twice has been chosen for Percent for Art Commissions.  Her works are seen in the collections of the University of Alaska State Museum, Permanent Solo Exhibition Case; the Alaska State Council on the Arts, Contemporary Art Bank; the U.S. Department of the Interior, Indian Arts and Crafts Board; Anchorage Museum of History and Art; Doyon Limited, and numerous private collections in and outside Alaska.

Style
She uses metal and wood together, the hardness of the metal and the softness of the wood, make for a beautiful combination. She considers herself a contemporary native artist as opposed to a traditional artist. As masks (denaanaan’ edeetonee in Central Koyukon) were not used extensively by her people, she turned to the sculpture of the Yup'ik masks and other cultures for inspiration.

References

External links
 Kathleen Carlo in the New York Times.

Koyukon
Alaskan Athabaskan people
Artists from Alaska
American contemporary painters
Living people
Native American women artists
People from Fairbanks, Alaska
People from Tanana, Alaska
University of Alaska Fairbanks alumni
Year of birth missing (living people)
Native American woodcarvers
20th-century American sculptors
20th-century American women artists
21st-century American sculptors
21st-century American women artists
20th-century Native American women
20th-century Native Americans
21st-century Native American women
21st-century Native Americans
21st-century American painters
American women painters
Painters from Alaska